Imma xanthosticha is a moth in the family Immidae. It was described by Alfred Jefferis Turner in 1936. It is found in Australia, where it has been recorded from Queensland.

References

Moths described in 1936
Immidae
Moths of Australia